Phymatophaea maorias is a species of beetle in the subfamily Enopliinae. It is found in New Zealand.

References

External links 
 
 

Enopliinae
Beetles described in 2009
Beetles of New Zealand